The 1981 Yamaha Organs Trophy was a non-ranking snooker tournament, that was held between 2 and 8 March 1981 at the Assembly Rooms in Derby, England.
 


Main draw

Group 1

Group 2

Group 3

Group 4

Semi-finals

Final

Qualifying

Group 1

Group 2

Group 3

Group 4

Single frame play-off

References

British Open (snooker)
Yamaha Organs Trophy
Yamaha Organs Trophy
Yamaha Organs Trophy